Janet MacArthur Bond Arterton (born February 8, 1944) is a senior United States district judge of the United States District Court for the District of Connecticut.

Education and career

Arterton was born in Philadelphia, Pennsylvania. She received a Bachelor of Arts degree from Mount Holyoke College in 1966, and then received a Juris Doctor from Northeastern University School of Law in 1977. She was a law clerk for Judge Herbert Jay Stern of the United States District Court for the District of New Jersey from 1977 to 1978, and then was in private practice of law in New Haven, Connecticut from 1978 to 1995.

Federal judicial service

Arterton is a United States District Judge of the United States District Court for the District of Connecticut. She was nominated by President Bill Clinton on January 23, 1995, to a seat vacated by José A. Cabranes. She was confirmed by the United States Senate on March 24, 1995, and received her commission the same day. She assumed senior status on July 1, 2014.

See also 
 Ricci v. DeStefano

References

External links
 

1944 births
Living people
American women lawyers
American lawyers
Judges of the United States District Court for the District of Connecticut
United States district court judges appointed by Bill Clinton
Mount Holyoke College alumni
Northeastern University School of Law alumni
Lawyers from Philadelphia
20th-century American judges
21st-century American judges
20th-century American women judges
21st-century American women judges